Gia Cristine Mantegna (born Gina Cristine Mantegna; April 17, 1990) is an American actress. She is known for her role as Devin Levin on the ABC sitcom The Middle.

Personal life
While growing up Mantegna was a trained gymnast and ballerina. She plays piano and saxophone and is a skilled singer.
Gia's older sister, Mia, works as a makeup artist. Mia was diagnosed with autism as a toddler, but her parents took the advice of a teacher and put her in a regular school, which helped her develop important social skills.

Career
Mantegna made her acting debut at age 13 in the 2003 film Uncle Nino, alongside Anne Archer, Trevor Morgan and her father, Joe Mantegna. She later appeared in 13 Going on 30. In 2006, Mantegna portrayed the character of Grace Conrad in Warner Brothers' winter feature, Unaccompanied Minors. She was cast as one of the main roles in an American television pilot show Murder Book for Fox. She starred in The Neighbor alongside Matthew Modine, Michele Laroque and Ed Quinn.

She turned 18 in 2008, and decided to change her professional name to Gia.

In 2008, Mantegna made a guest appearance in the Season 3 episode, for television show Criminal Minds, in which her father stars, wherein she portrayed an abducted teen named Lindsey Vaughn, who witnesses her best friend's death. She also appeared on The Secret Life of the American Teenager in a recurring role as Patty Mary.

In 2010, Mantegna starred in the independent feature And Soon the Darkness.  She also appeared in the TeenNick television series Gigantic.

On December 9, 2010, Mantegna was announced as the 2011 Miss Golden Globe for the 68th Annual Golden Globe Award Ceremony.

In addition to film roles,  she played recurring characters on The Middle and Under the Dome.

In 2017, Mantegna reprised her Criminal Minds guest starring role "Lindsey Vaughn", now operating as a drug cartel hit woman.

Filmography

Film

Television

Web

References

External links

Actresses from New York City
American child actresses
American film actresses
American television actresses
American people of Italian descent
Living people
People from Manhattan
21st-century American actresses
Year of birth missing (living people)